The men's javelin throw at the 2010 African Championships in Athletics was held on August 1.

Results

External links
Results

Javelin
Javelin throw at the African Championships in Athletics